Statistics of Empress's Cup in the 2002 season.

Overview
It was contested by 21 teams, and Tasaki Perule FC won the championship.

Results

1st round
Fukuoka Jogakuin FC Anclas 0-4 Ohara Gakuen JaSRA
Ragazza FC Takatsuki Speranza 1-2 Nippon Sport Science University
Iga FC Fraulein 2-5 Okayama Yunogo Belle
Nippon TV Menina 3-0 Seiwa Gakuen High School
J. Sea Gull 2-0 Kochi JFC Rosa

2nd round
Nippon TV Beleza 1-0 Ohara Gakuen JaSRA
JEF United Ichihara 3-1 AS Elfen Sayama FC
Takarazuka Bunnys 1-3 Nippon Sport Science University
Okayama Yunogo Belle 1-4 Saitama Reinas FC
Iga FC Kunoichi 2-1 Nippon TV Menina
Shimizudaihachi SC 0-4 YKK Tohoku LSC Flappers
Speranza FC Takatsuki 8-0 Renaissance Kumamoto FC
J. Sea Gull 0-4 Tasaki Perule FC

Quarterfinals
Nippon TV Beleza 4-0 JEF United Ichihara
Nippon Sport Science University 0-2 Saitama Reinas FC
Iga FC Kunoichi 1-1 (pen 0-3) YKK Tohoku LSC Flappers
Speranza FC Takatsuki 0-1 Tasaki Perule FC

Semifinals
Nippon TV Beleza 1-0 Saitama Reinas FC
YKK Tohoku LSC Flappers 1-3 Tasaki Perule FC

Final
Nippon TV Beleza 0-1 Tasaki Perule FC
Tasaki Perule FC won the championship.

References

Empress's Cup
2002 in Japanese women's football